Lonell de Beer (born 12 June 1980) is a South African former cricketer who played as a right-arm leg break bowler. She appeared in 11 One Day Internationals for South Africa between 2005 and 2007. She played domestic cricket for Northerns, as well as stints with Lancashire and Staffordshire.

References

External links
 
 

1980 births
Living people
Cricketers from Pretoria
South African women cricketers
South Africa women One Day International cricketers
Northerns women cricketers
Lancashire women cricketers
Staffordshire women cricketers